Herman David Koppel, known in Denmark as Herman D. Koppel, (Copenhagen, 1 October 1908 – Copenhagen, 14 July 1998)  was a composer and pianist of Jewish origin. Born in Copenhagen, he fled the Nazis with his family to Sweden in 1943. He wrote 7 symphonies, numerous concertos, 6 string quartets and other chamber music, piano works, operas and film music.

He was the father of Anders Koppel and Thomas Koppel, both composers, Lone Koppel, an opera singer, and Therese Koppel, pianist, and the brother of the violinist Julius Koppel.

Early life and education
Born on 1 October 1908 in Copenhagen, Herman David Koppel was the son of Isak Meyer Koppel (1888–1970) and Maria Hendeles (1889–1984). He was born shortly after his Jewish parents had emigrated to Denmark from Poland.

Like his younger brother Julius (1910–2005), a violinist and concertmaster, he studied piano from the age of 17 at the Royal Danish Conservatory under Rudolph Simonsen and Emilius Bangert. In addition, he studied privately under the Norwegian-Danish pianist Anders Rachlew (1882–1970) and undertook study trips to Germany, England and France.

Career

Pianist
As a pianist, Koppel premiered in 1930 at a concert where he included Carl Nielsen's Opus 40, "Theme with Variations", which was enthusiastically acclaimed as "never having been played so beautifully as this evening". Shortly before Nielsen's death in 1931, Koppel performed a concert dedicated to his music, first playing the pieces for Nielsen himself. Thereafter, throughout his life, Koppel continued to perform Nielsen's compositions.

In addition to Nielsen's music, Koppel's repertoire included romantic pieces, especially those by Mozart and Brahms. He also frequently played more modern music from a variety of composers, including the concertos of Bartok, Hans Werner Henze and Darius Milhaud and pieces by Stravinksy and Arnold Schönberg. Koppel played chamber music in the Koppel Quartet and accompanied singers including Aksel Schiøtz and his daughter Lone Koppel.

Composer
As a composer he was self-taught. His début composition was a string quartet (1928–29) which, like his other early works, was inspired by Nielsen and Stravinsky. The first work in his own style was his Piano Concerto No. 1 in March 1933, with its primitive Russian dance rhythms and Afro-American jazz. Koppel himself preferred his Piano Concerto No. 2 (1938) while No. 3 (1948) is Denmark's most popular piano concerto and one of the few to be published as a recording.

Only a few of the works he wrote in the 1930s have survived. The most important is the jazz-inspired music he wrote together with Bernhard Christensen for Kjeld Abell's musical comedy Melodien der blev væk (The Melody That Got Lost) premiered in 1935. During the German occupation of Denmark in the Second World War, Koppel, together with his wife and two small children, had to move to Sweden. It was there he wrote his Symphony No. 3. His Tre Davidssalmer (1950) was inspired by an episode he witnessed during the war when a group of Jews locked inside a German truck began to sing slowly and softly.

Koppel wrote seven symphonies, his fifth winning the Tivoli competition in 1956. His most successful works are his oratorios: Moses (1964), Requiem (1966) and Lovsange (1973). His only opera Macbeth, performed at the Royal Danish Theatre in 1970, was less successful, receiving mixed reviews. As for his chamber music, the most often performed are his Sekstet for klaver og blæsere (1942) and Ternio for cello and piano (1951). Koppel also wrote music for 29 films and several stage and radio plays. He continued to compose and perform until the mid-1990.

Personal life 
Koppel died in Copenhagen on 14 July 1998 and is buried in Vestre Cemetery.

Works
Musiques régénérées

Orchestral works
Symphony No. 1 (1931) Op. 5
Symphony No. 2 (1943) Op. 37
Symphony No. 3 Op. 39 (1944–45)
Symphony No. 4 Op. 42 (1946)
Symphony No. 5 Op. 60 (1955)
Symphony No. 6 (1957) Sinfonia Breve Op. 63
Symphony No. 7 (1960–61) Op.70
Music for Strings (1930)
Music for Jazz Orchestra (1932)
Variations for Small Orchestra (1935)
Festival Overture (1939)
Concertino No. 1, for String Orchestra (1937–38)
Concertino No. 2, for String Orchestra (1957)
Sinfonietta (1945)
Concerto for Orchestra (1977–78) Op. 101
Intrada (1979)
Prelude to a Symphony, Op. 105 (1979)
I Dis og Drøm (1992) String Orchestra
Memory (1994) String Orchestra

Works for solo instrument and orchestra/ensemble
Piano Concerto No. 1 (1931–32)
Piano Concerto No. 2 Op. 30 (1936–37)
Piano Concerto No. 3 Op. 45 (1948) 
Piano Concerto No. 4 (1960–63)
Violin Concerto (1929)
Capriccio for violin and orchestra (1934)
Clarinet Concerto Op. 35 (1941)
Double Concerto for Violin, Viola and Orchestra Op. 43 (1947)
Cello Concerto Op. 56 (1952–56)
Oboe Concerto (1970)
Chamber Concerto for Violin and String Orchestar (1970)
Flute Concerto Op. 87 (1971)
8 Variations and Epilogue, for piano and orchestra (1972)
Triple Concertino, for string trio and orchestra (1983)

Chamber works
String Quartet no.1 (1928–29)
String Quartet no.2 (1939) Op. 34
String Quartet no.3 (1944–45) Op. 38
String Quartet no.4 (1964)
String Quartet no.5 (1975)
String Quartet no.6 (1979)
Duo pour violon et piano (1930)
Trio pour clarinette, violon et piano (1931)
Sonatine for Wind Quintet (1932)
Variations on a Jewish folk dance vl, vla, vlc (1932)
Duo pour clarinette et basson (1932)
11 variationer over eget tema [11 Variations on a theme of my own] fl, vl, vla, vlc (1935)
Suite fl, vl, vlc (1936)
Sextuor pour instruments à vent et piano Op. 36 (1942)
Fantaisie pour clarinette seule (1947)
Ternio I pour violoncelle et violon et piano Op. 53b (1951)
Quintette avec piano Op. 57 (1953)
Divertimento Pastorale ob, vla, vlc  (1955)
Sonate pour violoncelle et piano Op. 62 (1956)
Variations pour clarinette et piano (1961)
Capriccio pour flûte et piano (1961)
9 variations pno, vl, vlc (1969)
4 improvisationer [4 Improvisations] fl, vlc (1970)
Suite pour violoncelle seul Op. 86 (1971)
Koncert for fløjte og orkester [Concerto for Flute and Orchestra] Flute and Piano  (1971)
Trio pno, vl, vlc Op. 88 (1971)
8 variations et epiloque pour piano et 13 instrumentistes (1972)
Divertimento pour trio à cordes (1972)
Ternio II pour saxophone seul (1973)
Variazioni Pastorale fl, vl, vla, vlc (1975)
Variazoni libre 2 cl, Bcl, perc (1976)
Dialog Tema med variarioner og monolog for fløjtesolo [Dialogue] Flute solo (1977)
Patch-work fl, arpa, vla  (1981)
Quartet pno, vl, vla, vlc (1986)
Trio cl, pno, vlc (1986)
Cantilena Duo vl, vlc (1988)
Musik for Blæseroktet [Music for Wind Octet] Wind Octet Op. 123 (1991)
Musik for violin og klaver [Music for violin and Piano] Violin and Piano (1991)
Giocattolo fl, cl, perc, pno, vlc (1993)

Works for piano

Piano Sonata E minor, op. 1, 1928
Variations and Fugue for Piano, op. 3, 1929
Piano Piece, op. 7, 1930
Suite for Klavier [Suite for Piano] Op. 21 (1934)
Sonata no. 1 for Piano, op. 50, 1950
15 miniaturer [15 Miniatures] op. 97a (1976)

References

External links
The Edition-s-dk site lists many of Koppel's compositions

1908 births
1998 deaths
Jewish classical composers
Jewish Danish musicians
Danish classical composers
Danish male classical composers
Danish classical pianists
Danish Jews
20th-century classical composers
Jews who emigrated to escape Nazism
Pupils of Carl Nielsen
20th-century classical pianists
Male classical pianists
20th-century male musicians